CRK can refer to:
 Chris Reeve Knives, an American knife manufacturer
 Český Radioklub, an amateur radio organization in the Czech Republic
 IATA Airport Code for Clark International Airport, formerly Diosdado Macapagal International Airport 
 CRK (gene)
 CRK is the ICAO airline designator for Hong Kong Airlines, Hong Kong SAR
 CRK is the IATA aircraft designator for the Bombardier CRJ 1000
Republican Circle, a Belgican republican association
 Cookie Run: Kingdom, a South Korean 2021 RPG mobile game